Virgil O. Parrett Field  or Angwin Airport  is a public use airport located one nautical mile (1.85 km) east of the central business district of Angwin, in Napa County, California, United States. It is owned by Pacific Union College.
It is also known as Angwin–Parrett Field Airport. In 2006, a plan was floated for Pacific Union College to divest the field by selling it for $27 million to the County of Napa.

Facilities and aircraft 
It has one runway designated 16/34 with an asphalt surface measuring 3,217 by 50 feet (981 x 15 m).

For the 12-month period ending November 19, 2004, the airport had 12,000 general aviation aircraft operations, an average of 32 per day. At that time there were 38 aircraft based at this airport: 92% single-engine and 8% multi-engine.

References

External links 
 2O3 - Angwin/Parrett, California by Robert French, flight instructor
 

Airports in Napa County, California